Royal Automobile Club may refer to:

 Royal Automobile Club, a British private club of automobile enthusiasts
 Royal Automobile Club Foundation, a British motoring advocacy group
 Royal Automobile Club of Australia, an Australian motoring organisation, headquartered in Sydney, New South Wales
 Royal Automobile Club of Belgium, a Belgian automobile association
 Royal Automobile Club of Tasmania, an Australian motoring club and mutual organisation
 Royal Automobile Club of Queensland, an Australian motoring club and mutual organisation
 Royal Automobile Club of Spain, a Spanish automobile association
 Royal Automobile Club of Victoria, an Australian motoring club and mutual organisation
 Royal Automobile Club of Western Australia, an Australian motoring club and mutual organisation
 RAC (company), a British company supplying products and services for motorists, formerly owned by the British Royal Automobile Club
 Royal Automobile Club (Sweden), a Swedish association for car owners